Wellington is a cantonment town in the Coonoor sub-Division of  Nilgiris District of Tamil Nadu. One of its most famous residents was Field Marshal Sam Manekshaw, who died in the town on June 27, 2008. This town is adjacent to the city of Coonoor. Its Postal Index Number is 643231.
Wellington is a Class II Cantonment. The administration and upkeep of the Cantonment is undertaken by the Cantonment Executive Officer of the DGDE, Ministry of Defence.

Landmark and Geography
The Cantonment has a total area of 1647.65 acres.

A prominent landmark in the cantonment is the War Memorial. Maintained by The Madras Regimental Centre (MRC), it is today decked with display of a decommissioned Infantry Combat Vehicle (ICV) and a MiG 21 FL C-508. The elevation of the War Memorial is 1840 metres. This round-about uniquely has ten roads leading off of it.

The Waterloo Road leads from Waterloo Bridge/Black Bridge/Manekshaw Bridge, past the Military Hospital, and onto the Madras Regimental Centre. The road is part of MDR 1081, which continues past MRC, through the War Memorial, past Wellington Gymkhana Club, to Sim's Park, Coonoor, where it now starts MDR 1073 to Kotagiri.

TDK Pillai road leads from the War Memorial, past the Supply Depot, to Lower Coonoor. A branch of this road, just after the Supply Depot, leads to the Wellington Railway Station.

Due west, and visible from most portions of the Cantonment, is the tallest peak of the Nilgiris, Doddabetta.

The Wellington marsh lies in the valley bowl due north-west of the Military Hospital, below Waterloo Road. Run-off from the marsh feeds the Mynala stream.

The Mynala stream flows down from the east-face of Dodabetta, and then alongside the NH 181 from near Boys' Company, under Black Bridge/Waterloo Bridge/Manekshaw Bridge, onwards to the Coonoor River at Lower Coonoor (Kurumbadi).

Demography
As of the 2011 census of India, the cantonment has a total population of 19462 residents, of which 12673 are civilians, and 6789 are Military population (personnel and families and dependants). Of the total population, males and females are in the ratio of 10867:8595 (79.09%). The skew is primarily on account of the very large population of single men as recruits at the MRC.

Main Occupants
Wellington Cantonment is home to the Regimental Centre for the Madras Regiment (MRC) of the Indian Army. Associated to the MRC, is the Records Office for Other Ranks of the Regiment.

Wellington Cantonment also houses The Defence Services Staff College (DSSC), a premier tri-service training establishment that imparts training to field grade officers of the three wings of the Indian Armed Forces, friendly foreign countries and various Indian Civil Service departments. The list of alumni of the DSSC at Wellington includes Field Marshal Sam Manekshaw, former Fijian strongman Sitiveni Rabuka, Nigerian President Olusegun Obasanjo, head of German special forces Hans-Christoph Ammon, Naval Commander Dhananjay Joshi and former governor of the Reserve Bank of India RN Malhotra. 
The college has a glorious past and traces its lineage to 1905 when it was set up at Devlali. In 1907 it shifted to Quetta, now in Pakistan. The College shifted back to India in 1947 and is now home to a course of the joint services for the three services under one roof.

Surrounding Hamlets
 Related to MRC, and probably as old as the Cantonment itself, is Boys' Company. Located on NH 181, it was probably the location of an associated camp for local workers of the Garrison. The location is called Guava Hill, of which 'Ava Hill' survives today.
 Jagathala. Supposedly the Badaga settlement of Jackatalla which became home to the British troops in the mid-Nineteenth century, but was renamed as Wellington. Today, Jagathala is a Town-Panchayat under Kotagiri sub-Division.
 Singarathopu. A small collection of recent settlers, it comprises mostly retired personnel of the Madras Regiment, and some Tamil settlers from Sri Lanka.
 Babu Nagar. A refugee settlement, it lies due west of the Cantonment, in the valley bowl.
 Chinna Bandisolai. Another mix recent settlement of refugees from Sri Lanka, and retired personnel of the Madras Regiment. This village lies between the Waterloo Road, and Gorkha Hill.
 Beratti. A traditional Badaga hamlet, lands of this village were acquired to establish residences for the officers on course at DSSC.
 Kambisolai. Another traditional Badaga village, this lies above the Beratti village, and is the entry-point to Ralliah Reserve Forest.
 Bharat Nagar. A refugee settlement, located on the Kotagiri road from War Memorial, this village provides the chunk of locally sourced manpower for the functioning of the DSSC.
 Arul Nagar. A small settlement of Sri Lankan Refugees, this lies at two kilometres from Chinna Bandisolai, at the entrance of Pemberley Estate.

Market Place
The stretch of Waterloo Road from the Military Hospital to MRC is locally called Barracks. The stretch hosts the local market, including a portion in the erstwhile Wood-Yard (now only the abbreviated WY remains in the numbers of the shops there). The shops include:-
 Grocery. A shop selling Patanjali products at WY-1; A provisions shop at WY-6; A provisions shop in the Central Hotel building; A shop at the 'New Shopping Complex' opposite Cholayil Gate of MRC.
 Confectionery. Sri Nandhika, an Iyengar bakery, at WY-3; Needs, a long-standing provider of bakes and home-made chocolates on order; Friends Bakery, at the 'New Shopping Complex' opposite Cholayil Gate of MRC.
 Vegetables and Fruit. SJ Vegetables and Friends Vegetables in the WY area; a contract shop in Central Hotel building, and SJ Vegetables near the 'New Shopping Complex' opposite Cholayil Gate of MRC.
 Medicines. Sugam Medicals at 'New Shopping Complex' opposite Cholayil Gate of MRC.
 Mobile phone services. At WY, at Central Hotel building, and near the 'New Shopping Complex' opposite Cholayil Gate of MRC.
 Eatery. The Nest, a local restaurant, in the WY area; Central Hotel (famous for whole chicken roasted on a rotisserie); some biryani joints in the WY area.
 Fresh meats. Chicken (broiler and country-bird), quail (on order), and mutton are available all through the week. Beef or pork is not provided even on order.

Post Office
Wellington Cantonment has two Post Offices. The main one, with the postal code 643231, is located opposite MRC, and is colloquially known as Barracks PO.
The other is a sub-PO, located inside DSSC campus. This is a collection office only; the postal code is the same as for Barracks PO.
All forms of mail are despatched from the post-office; other than speed-post, all other forms of mail delivery is provided by the PO.
Other associated services (savings schemes) are offered by both counters.

Banks & ATMs
 State Bank of India has a branch inside the DSSC premises. There is a co-located ATM.

 Syndicate Bank has a branch inside the DSSC premises, and another on Waterloo Road. Both branches have co-located ATMs.

 Axis Bank has an ATM at the DSSC campus.

 Karur Vysya Bank has an ATM at the 'New Shopping Complex' opposite Cholayil Gate of MRC.

See also
 Wellington, Tamil Nadu
 Black Bridge (The Nilgiris)
 Defence Services Staff College
 The Madras Regimental Centre

References

Cantonments of British India
Cantonments of India
Tourist attractions in Nilgiris district